The African Capacity for Immediate Response to Crises (ACIRC) is a temporary multinational African interventionist standby force set up in November 2013. It will be replaced by the African Standby Force when it becomes fully operational.

References

External links
 New 'super' combat brigade: creation of an African elite?
 Report of the AUC Chairperson on the operationalisation of the Rapid Deployment Capability of the ASF and the ACIRC

Multinational units and formations